Baybay Elementary School is a public school in Barangay Baybay, Tangalan, Aklan, Philippines.

See also
 List of schools in Tangalan
 Education in the Philippines

References

External links
 DepEd Region VI Website
 Data.gov Website
 MOOE for 2014

Schools in Aklan
1963 establishments in the Philippines
Educational institutions established in 1963